KRY may refer to:

 IATA code for Karamay Airport, China
 ISO 639-3 code for the Kryts language
 Yamaguchi Broadcasting, also known as KRY
 Bour Kry (born 1945), Supreme Patriarch of the Thammayut order of Cambodia
 The Kry, a band from Canada
 LIVI, a Swedish medical app called KRY in Sweden and Norway